The  is a Japanese railway line in Kumamoto Prefecture, between Tateno Station, Minamiaso, and Takamori Station, Takamori. This is the only railway line  operates. As the company name suggests, the line traverses the south part of Mount Aso caldera.  

Following the damage from severe earthquakes in April 2016, the entire Takamori Line was shut down. A section of the line between Nakamatsu and Takamori resumed service in July of the same year. As of September 2019, the section between Tateno and Nakamatsu are still closed. The Ministry of Land, Infrastructure, Transport and Tourism estimates that a complete restoration will cost between 6.5 to 7 billion yen. 

A station on the line, Minamiaso Mizu-no-Umareru-Sato Hakusui-Kōgen Station, is tied with Chōjagahamashiosaihamanasukōenmae Station in Ibaraki Prefecture as the longest station name in Japan, with 22 kana.

Basic data
Double-track line: None
Electric supply: Not electrified
Railway signalling: Simplified automatic
Stations with passing loops: 1 (Nakamatsu Station)

History
The entire line was opened by the then Japanese Government Railways in 1928.

Freight services ceased in 1984. The third-sector company took over the former JNR line in 1986. The MLIT tested a DMV railbus on the line in November, 2007.

Proposed connection
After the Takachiho line opened in 1972, construction of the 23 km section to Takamori continued until 1975, when flooding in the 6,500 m Takamori tunnel (7 km north of Takamori) resulted in work being suspended. Construction was formally abandoned in 1980.

Stations
All stations are within Kumamoto Prefecture. Stations with a gray background are damaged from the 2016 Kumamoto earthquakes and are not in operation.

See also
List of railway companies in Japan
List of railway lines in Japan

References

External links 
  

Railway lines in Japan
Rail transport in Kumamoto Prefecture
Railway lines opened in 1928
Japanese third-sector railway lines